John Folau (born 23 September 1994) is a rugby league and rugby union footballer who plays for the Sydney Rays in the National Rugby Championship competition. He is a former Tonga international rugby league footballer.

Background
Folau was born in Brisbane, Queensland, Australia. He is of Tongan descent and played his junior football for the Goodna Eagles, Souths Acacia Ridge and Minto Cobras, before being signed by the Parramatta Eels. Folau attended Marsden State High School and Patrician Brothers' College, Blacktown, where he represented the New South Wales Combined Catholic Colleges rugby league team.

Folau is the younger brother of former Melbourne Storm and Brisbane Broncos player, and former NSW Waratahs and Wallabies player Israel Folau.

Rugby league

Early career
From 2012 to 2014, Folau played for the Parramatta Eels' NYC team. In April 2013, he was 18th man for the Queensland Under-20s team. In May 2014, he played for the Queensland Under-20s team.

2014
In October 2014, Folau played for Tonga against Papua New Guinea.

2015
In 2015, Folau moved on to the Eels' New South Wales Cup team, Wentworthville Magpies. In Round 3 of the 2015 NRL season, he made his NRL debut for the Eels against the New Zealand Warriors. On 4 April 2015, he re-signed with the Eels on a 2-year contract. In May 2015, Folau was named 18th man for Tonga against Samoa in the 2015 Polynesian Cup.

2018
After being unable to break into the Parramatta first grade side, Folau signed a contract to join the Blacktown Workers Sea Eagles for the 2018 Intrust Super Premiership NSW season.

Rugby union

New South Wales Waratahs
On 4 September, Folau announced that he was quitting rugby league and switching to rugby union signing with the Sydney Rays. Following Folau's move to the NRC, the New South Wales Waratahs signed Folau shortly before the start of the 2019 season, joining his brother, Israel Folau. He was released in June 2019 without ever playing a match for the team.

References

External links
2015 Parramatta Eels profile

1994 births
Living people
Australian rugby league players
Australian rugby union players
Australian sportspeople of Tongan descent
Tonga national rugby league team players
Parramatta Eels players
Rugby league centres
Rugby league wingers
Rugby league players from Brisbane
Rugby union players from Brisbane
Wentworthville Magpies players